Dwayne Kelly (born 19 October 1991) is a South African professional rugby union player, who most recently played with the  in the domestic Currie Cup and Vodacom Cup competitions. His regular position is scrum-half.

Career

Youth rugby

Kelly represented the  Under-13 and Under-14 sides in 2005 and 2006. After he relocated to KwaZulu-Natal in 2006, he represented the Under-16  in 2007, as well as the KZN Under-18 Academy team.

Kelly captained the Westville Boys' High School first XV rugby team while he was in his matric year and made six starts for the  team in the 2010 Under-19 Provincial Championship. He also played for and captained the senior Sharks Sevens team in 2011.

Eastern Province Kings / NMMU Madibaz

In May 2012, he joined the Port Elizabeth-based , appearing for their Under-21 team in the 2012 Under-21 Provincial Championship. He made two appearances off the bench during the regular season, but started in both their semi-final – scoring 18 of his side's points in a 67–5 victory over  – and the final, where he helped Eastern Province win the competition by beating  24–10 in Port Elizabeth. He also started their promotion play-off match against , but could not prevent the side lose 15–21 to remain in Group B for 2013.

Kelly represented Port Elizabeth-based university side  during the 2013 Varsity Cup; he was their first-choice scrum-half for the campaign, starting all eight of their matches as he helped NMMU Madibaz qualify for the semi-final of the competition for the first time in their history. His performances in the competition were noted by the South African Universities selectors and he was included in their team that a match against  in May 2013.

He made a total of five starts and five substitute appearances during the competition, helping them to second spot on the log.

He made six appearances during the competition, but could not help them reach the quarter-finals, finishing in fifth spot on the Southern Section log.

SWD Eagles

In May 2014, it was announced that Kelly joined George-based side  for the 2014 and 2015 seasons.

It wasn't enough to help SWD finish top of the log and earn a spot in the 2014 Currie Cup Premier Division, instead remaining in the First Division. He started all five of their matches during the regular season of that competition to help his side finish third on the log. However, SWD couldn't beat the Griffons in the semi-finals, with the side from Welkom winning that match 45–43 (and subsequently becoming champions).

Kelly missed the opening three rounds of the 2015 Vodacom Cup, but returned to start all their remaining five matches in the competition. He scored a try in their 31–10 victory over former side the Eastern Province Kings to help the SWD Eagles finish in fourth spot on the log to qualify for the quarter finals.

Return to the Eastern Province Kings

After spending a year in George, Kelly returned to Port Elizabeth to rejoin the Eastern Province Kings prior to the 2015 Currie Cup Premier Division.

Statistics

References

South African rugby union players
Eastern Province Elephants players
Living people
1991 births
Rugby union players from Bloemfontein
Rugby union scrum-halves